Sanne in 't Hof (born 24 January 1998) is a Dutch female speed skater who specialises in middle and long distances.

At the junior World Championships in 2017 she won silver in the 1500m, 3000m and mass start events.

In 't Hof qualified for the 5000m at the 2022 Winter Olympics by finishing second in the Dutch Olympic qualifying event.

Personal bests

References

External links
 

1998 births
Living people
Dutch female speed skaters
Olympic speed skaters of the Netherlands
Speed skaters at the 2022 Winter Olympics
20th-century Dutch women
21st-century Dutch women